Cochlospermum vitifolium is a tree in the family Bixaceae. It is native to the Americas: from Mexico to Brazil.

References

vitifolium
Trees of Mexico
Trees of South America